Andoversford Junction railway station was in Gloucestershire on the Great Western Railway's Banbury and Cheltenham Direct Railway that opened in 1881. Situated about six miles east of Cheltenham, the station served the village of Andoversford with its large market, which provided much of the traffic at the station.

History

In 1891, the Midland and South Western Junction Railway extended its line northwards from Cirencester to a junction with the GWR Cheltenham to Banbury line just east of Andoversford station. M&SWJR trains ran into Cheltenham over the GWR tracks, but were not permitted to call at Andoversford station until 1904. The M&SWJR opened its own station, called Andoversford and Dowdeswell, on the opposite side of the village. Under the Grouping, the GWR took control of the M&SWJR; it renamed Andoversford station as Andoversford Junction in 1926 and closed Andoversford and Dowdeswell to passenger traffic the following year, though it remained open for goods.

The station passed on to the Western Region of British Railways on nationalisation in 1948. It was then closed by the British Transport Commission.

The site today

The M&SWJR line closed to passengers in 1961 and the Cheltenham to Banbury line a year later. Andoversford station was demolished and housing was built on the site on a road called 'Pine Halt'.

References

 
 
 
 
 Station on navigable O.S. map

 

Disused railway stations in Gloucestershire
Former Great Western Railway stations
Railway stations in Great Britain opened in 1881
Railway stations in Great Britain closed in 1962
1881 establishments in England